Gadag-Betageri  is a city municipal council in Gadag district in the state of Karnataka, India. It is the administrative headquarters of Gadag District. The original city of Gadag and its sister city Betageri (or Betgeri) have a combined city administration. Kanaginahal of Gadag is the birthplace of the first co-operative society in Asia. The temples of Veera Narayana and Trikuteshwara are places of religious and historic importance.

Gadag style of architecture

The Gadag style of Architecture, marked by Ornate pillars with intricate sculpture, originated during the period of the Western Chalukya (or Kalyani Chalukyas) king Someswara I, and it flourished for a period of 150 years (During  to ) during which period some 50 temples were built; some examples being:
The Trikuteshwara temple complex at Gadag,
The Kasivisvesvara temple, Lakkundi,
The Doddabasappa Temple at Dambal,
The Amriteshwara temple at Annigeri,
etc.

Demographics
 India census, Gadag-Betageri had a population of 172,813. Males constitute 86,165 of the population and females 86,648. Gadag-Betageri has an average literacy rate of 85.56%. The Sex ratio is about 1006 females per 1000 males to females. 18,419 of the population is under 6 years of age.

Kannada is the main and widely spoken language, English and Hindi are spoken and understood by few people.

Climate

Notable people 

 Kumara Vyasa - Gadag immediately brings to mind the name of Naranappa, popularly known as Kumara Vyasa, the author of Karnata Bharata Kathamanjari. It is the classic Mahabharata in Kannada. Naranappa was born in the nearby village of Koliwada. He composed his work sitting before Lord Veera Narayana, his chosen deity. 
 Ganayogi Panchakshara Gawai, visually challenged singer from Gadag. His music school Veereshwara Punyashrama  is a renowned institution in north Karnataka.
 Puttaraj Gawai, recipient of the "Padma Bhushan" Award from Govt Of India, visually challenged Indian musician  (classical Hindustani tradition), scholar, music teacher and social servant. A student of  Ganayogi Panchakshara Gawai (above). He headed the Veereshwara Punyashrama until he died in late 2010.
 Bhimsen Joshi, Hindustani singer, recipient of the Bharat Ratna Award - Highest Civilian Honour of India
 Sunil Joshi, cricketer, born in Gadag.
 Huilgol Narayana Rao, writer of "Udayavagali namma cheluva kannada nadu" the anthem which heralded the birth of Karnataka state.
 Vijay Sankeshwar, businessman, founder of VRL Group, Vijaya Karnataka newspaper and Vijayavani.
 Vilas Nilgund, runner, who represented India in 100 metre sprint, and 4x100 metre.
 R. S. Mugali famous writer and author of "Kannada Sahitya Charitre"
 Giraddi Govindaraj famous critic and former president of "Karnataka Sahitya Akademi"
 G. B. Joshi famous playwright and founder of "Manohara Granthamala"

See also
Lakkundi

References

External links

Gadag-Betageri municipality website

Western Chalukya Empire
Cities and towns in Gadag district
Cities in Karnataka